Acinetobacter baylyi is a bacterial species of the genus Acinetobacter. As with other species of Acinetobacter it is characterized by being a nonmotile, gram negative coccobacillus. It grows under aerobic conditions, is catalase positive and oxidase negative. A. baylyi is known for being natural competent, meaning that it can take up exogenous DNA from its surroundings and incorporate the DNA into its own chromosomal DNA by transformation (genetics)

References

Moraxellaceae
Bacteria described in 2003